Time is a 2021 three-part TV drama written by Jimmy McGovern, directed by Lewis Arnold, and starring Sean Bean and Stephen Graham. It was first broadcast on BBC One on 6 June 2021.

In March 2022 the series was officially renewed for a second series.

Plot
Mark Cobden is newly imprisoned, consumed by guilt for his crime, and way out of his depth in the volatile world of prison life. He meets Eric McNally, an excellent prison officer doing his best to protect those in his charge. However, when one of the most dangerous inmates identifies his weakness, Eric faces an impossible choice between his principles and his family.

Cast
Sean Bean as Mark Cobden
Stephen Graham as Eric McNally
James Nelson-Joyce as Johnno
Nabil Elouahabi as Patterson
Natalie Gavin as Jardine
Hannah Walters as Sonia McNally
Nadine Marshall as Alicia Cobden
Jack McMullen as Daniel
Sue Johnston as June Cobden
David Calder as John Cobden
Jonathan Harden as Brendan Murphy
Siobhan Finneran as Marie-Louise
Kadiff Kirwan as Pete
Aneurin Barnard as Bernard
Terence Maynard as Kavanagh/"Kav"
Kevin Harvey as Paul McAdams
Cal MacAninch as Galbraith
Brian McCardie as Jackson Jones
Michael Socha as Kenny Meadows
Jason Done as P.O. Banks
Lee Morris as Tom

Production
The wings and cells prison scenes were filmed at HM Prison Shrewsbury, a former prison which was decommissioned in 2013, however most of the filming took place in the Liverpool City Region. The cameras moved to Liverpool to create the rest of the prison with a mash-up of courtrooms, police stations and education buildings, as well as exterior locations such as the Silver Jubilee Bridge in Widnes and the Southport Pier.

Episodes

Reception
Writing in The Guardian, Lucy Mangan wrote: "The performances of Bean and Graham are, even though we have come to expect brilliance from them both, astonishing. So, too, are those from everyone in smaller roles, none of which is underwritten or sketchy, and who thicken the drama into something more profoundly moving and enraging at every turn". Billie Schwab Dunn, writing for Metro, praised the show, which was "elevated by the central performances – particularly Bean, who gently grounds us and provides a beam of light in all that darkness".

Awards and nominations

References

External links

2021 British television series debuts
2020s British drama television series
2020s British television miniseries
BBC prison television shows
Television series by BBC Studios
Television shows set in England